"Pearls Mean Tears" is the third episode of the second series of the 1990s British comedy television series Jeeves and Wooster. It is also called "The Con".

In the US, the episode was aired as the first episode of the fourth series of Jeeves and Wooster. It aired on 8 January 1995 on Masterpiece Theatre. The episode "Sir Watkyn Bassett's Memoirs" was aired as the third episode of the second series instead.

Background 
Adapted from "Aunt Agatha Takes the Count" (collected in The Inimitable Jeeves) and "The Rummy Affair of Old Biffy" (collected in Carry On, Jeeves).

Cast
 Jeeves – Stephen Fry
 Bertie Wooster – Hugh Laurie
 Aunt Agatha – Mary Wimbush
 Sidney Hemmingway – Graham Seed
 Aline Hemmingway – Rebecca Saire
 Charles "Biffy" Biffen – Philip Shelley
 Sir Roderick Glossop – Roger Brierley
 Lady Glossop – Jane Downs
 Honoria Glossop – Elizabeth Kettle
 Barmy Fotheringay-Phipps – Martin Clunes
 Oofy Prosser – Richard Dixon
 Manager – Robert Aldous
 Sergeant – Christopher Whittingham

Plot
Aunt Agatha intends to engage Bertie to "a nice quiet girl" named Aline Hemmingway. Bertie is forced to spend some time with Aline and her brother, Rev. Sidney Hemmingway, but finds them dreary. After Sidney loses money at the races, he borrows £100 from Bertie with Aline's pearl necklace on deposit. Coincidentally, Aunt Agatha's pearl necklace goes missing.

Charles Edward Biffen ("Biffy") cannot find a girl to whom he was engaged, named Mabel. Primarily because he cannot remember her surname. Biffy comes to Jeeves for help, but Jeeves, who happens to be the Mabel's uncle, and misunderstands Biffy's intentions, does not wish to help. Mabel is now a British burlesque dancer and showgirl who performs in the theatre. At the end Jeeves produces a plan to get Biffy and Mabel together and suggests to Biffy that he may go to the theatre. Disaster ensues when Biffy sees Mabel dancing and singing in the theatre. Biffy proposes and she accepts his proposal and Honoria cries hysterically.

See also
 List of Jeeves and Wooster characters

References

External links
 

Jeeves and Wooster episodes
1991 British television episodes